The Spink, also known as the Jefferson, is a historic apartment building located at Indianapolis, Indiana.  It was built in 1922, and is a six-story, "I"-shaped, Tudor Revival style red brick building on a raised basement.  It features full six-story projecting bays and two bay units starting on the third floor.

It was listed on the National Register of Historic Places in 1983.

References

Apartment buildings in Indiana
Residential buildings on the National Register of Historic Places in Indiana
Tudor Revival architecture in Indiana
Residential buildings completed in 1922
Residential buildings in Indianapolis
National Register of Historic Places in Indianapolis